Matt McMahon may refer to:
 Matt McMahon (basketball) (born 1978), men's college basketball head coach
 Matt McMahon (pianist), Australian jazz pianist and composer